Faria Lemos is a Brazilian municipality located 263 km (162 mi) north-northeast of Rio de Janeiro in the state of Minas Gerais. The city belongs to the mesoregion of Zona da Mata and to the microregion of Muriaé.  As of 2020, the estimated population was 3,221.

See also
 List of municipalities in Minas Gerais

References

<>
 

Municipalities in Minas Gerais